The Academy of Television Arts & Sciences (ATAS), also colloquially known as the Television Academy, is a professional honorary organization dedicated to the advancement of the television industry in the United States. It is a 501(c)(6) non-profit organization founded in 1946, the organization presents the Primetime Emmy Awards, an annual ceremony honoring achievement in U.S. primetime television.

History
Syd Cassyd considered television a tool for education and envisioned an organization that would act outside the "flash and glamor" of the industry and become an outlet for "serious discussion" and award the industry's "finest achievements". Envisioning a television counterpart of the Academy of Motion Picture Arts and Sciences, Cassyd founded the Academy of Television Arts & Sciences in 1946 in conjunction with leaders of the early television industry who had gathered at a meeting he organized.

Cassyd's academy in Los Angeles merged with a New York academy founded by Ed Sullivan in 1955 to form the National Academy of Television Arts and Sciences. The Los Angeles chapter broke away from NATAS in 1977, keeping the Primetime and Los Angeles Emmys.

In 2014, alongside its Hall of Fame induction ceremony and announced plans to expand its headquarters, the organization announced that it had changed its public brand to the Television Academy, with a new logo designed by Siegel + Gale. The new branding was intended to downplay the organization's antiquated formal name in favor of a more straightforward identity, and features a separating line (typically used to separate the organization's wordmark from a simplified image of the Emmy Award statuette) used to symbolize a screen, and also portrayed as a "portal".

In 2016, producer Hayma Washington was elected chairman and CEO of the Academy of Arts and Sciences, becoming the first African-American to hold the position.

Emmy Award

In 1949, the Television Academy held the first Emmy Awards ceremony, an annual event created to recognize excellence in U.S. television programming, although the initial event was restricted to programming from the Los Angeles area. The name "Emmy" was derived from "Immy," a nickname for the image orthicon camera tube, which aided the progress of modern television. The word was feminized as "Emmy" to match the statuette, which depicted a winged woman holding an atom.

The Emmy Awards are administered by three sister organizations who focus on various sectors of television programming: the Academy of Television Arts & Sciences (primetime), the National Academy of Television Arts and Sciences (daytime, sports, news and documentary), and the International Academy of Television Arts and Sciences (international). The Academy of Television Arts & Sciences also presents the Los Angeles Emmy Awards.

Publications and programs
In addition to recognizing outstanding programming through its Primetime Emmy Awards, the Television Academy publishes the award-winning emmy magazine and through the Academy of Television Arts & Sciences Foundation, is responsible for the Archive of American Television, annual College Television Awards, Fred Rogers Memorial Scholarship, acclaimed student internships and other educational outreach programs.

Current governance
Frank Scherma (Chairman & Chief Executive Officer)
Sharon Lieblein, CSA (Vice Chair)
Rickey Minor (Second Vice Chair)
Ann Leslie Uzdavinis (Treasurer)
Allison Binder (Secretary)
George Cheeks (Chair's Appointee)
Channing Dungey (Chair's Appointee)
Gloria Calderón Kellett (Chair's Appointee)
Dawn Olmstead (Chair's Appointee)
Vernon Sanders (Chair's Appointee)
Zack Van Amburg (Chair's Appointee)
Daniel H. Birman (Governors' Appointee)
Debra Curtis (Governors' Appointee)
Jill Dickerson (Governors' Appointee)
Kim Taylor-Coleman, CSA (Governors' Appointee)
Cris Abrego (Chair, Television Academy Foundation)

Board of Governors

Animation
Kaz Aizawa
Joel Fajnor

Art Directors/Set Decorators
Halina Siwolop
James Yarnell

Casting Directors
Marc Hirschfeld, CSA
Kim Taylor-Coleman, CSA

Children's Programming
Jill Sanford
Troy Underwood

Choreography
Kathryn Burns
Dominique Kelley

Cinematographers
Kira Kelly
George Mooradian, ASC

Commercials
Rich Carter
Charlie McBrearty

Costume Design & Supervision
Laura Guzik
Luke Reichle

Daytime Programming
Brenda Brkusic Milinkovic
Renée Villafan

Directors
Anya Adams
Michael Spiller

Documentary Programming
Daniel H. Birman
Senain Kheshgi

Lighting, Camera & Technical Arts
Jeff Calderon
David Plakos

Los Angeles Area
Stephanie Hampton
Christie Lyn Lugo Leigh

Makeup Artists/Hairstylists
Nikki Carbonetta
Vito Trotta

Motion & Title Design
Ana Criado
Steve Viola

Music
Sherri Chung
Jeff Russo

Performers
Bob Bergen
Kim Estes

Picture Editors
Scott Boyd, ACE
Nena Erb, ACE

Professional Representatives
Bryan Leder
Glenn Rigberg

Producers
Tony Carey
Keith Raskin

Production Executives
Keiren Fisher
Hollann Sobers

Public Relations
Shannon Buck
Steve Spignese

Reality Programming
Jill Dickerson
Scott Freeman

Science & Technology
Wendy Aylsworth
Barry Zegel

Sound
Joe Earle, CAS
Phillip W. Palmer, CAS

Sound Editors
Ed Fassl
Chris Reeves

Special Visual Effects
Eddie Bonin
Derek Spears

Stunts
Lesley Aletter
Larry Rosenthal

Television Executives
Debra Curtis
Jo DiSante

Writers
Nicole Demerse
Judalina Neira

Television Academy Honors
See footnote
The Television Academy Honors were established in 2008 to recognize "Television with a Conscience"—television programming that inspires, informs, motivates and even has the power to change lives.

1st Annual (2008)
Alive Day Memories: Home from Iraq
Boston Legal
Girl Positive
God's Warriors
Law & Order: Special Victims Unit, "Harm"
Pictures of Hollis Woods
Planet Earth
Shame
Side Order of Life

2nd Annual (2009)
A Home for the Holidays (10th Annual)
Breaking the Huddle: The Integration of College Football
Brothers & Sisters, "Prior Commitments"
Extreme Makeover Home Edition, "The Martirez & Malek Families"
Masterpiece Contemporary: "God on Trial"
Stand Up to Cancer
30 Days
Whale Wars

3rd Annual (2010)
CSI: Crime Scene Investigation, "Coup De Grace"
Glee, "Wheels"
Grandpa, Do You Know Who I Am? With Maria Shriver
Explorer, "Inside Death Row"
Private Practice, "Nothing To Fear"
Taking Chance
Unlocking Autism
Vanguard, "The OxyContin Express"

4th Annual (2011)
The 16th Man
The Big C, "Taking The Plunge"
Friday Night Lights, "I Can't"
Jamie Oliver's Food Revolution
The Oprah Winfrey Show, "A Two-Day Oprah Show Event: 200 Adult Men Who Were Molested Come Forward"
Parenthood, "Pilot"
Private Practice, "Did You Hear What Happened to Charlotte King?"
Wartorn 1861–2010

5th Annual (2012)
The Dr. Oz Show
The Five
Harry's Law, "Head Games"
Hot Coffee
Men of a Certain Age, "Let the Sun Shine In"
Rescue Me, '344"
Women, War & Peace

6th Annual (2013)
A Smile as Big as the Moon
D.L. Hughley: The Endangered List
Half The Sky: Turning Oppression Into Opportunity For Women Worldwide
Hunger Hits Home
The Newsroom
Nick News with Linda Ellerbee
One Nation Under Dog: Stories of Fear, Loss & Betrayal
Parenthood

7th Annual (2014)
The Big C: Hereafter
Comedy Warriors
The Fosters
Mea Maxima Culpa
Mom
Screw You Cancer
Vice

8th Annual (2015)
black-ish, "Crime and Punishment"
E:60, "Dream On: Stories of Boston's Strongest"
The Normal Heart
Paycheck to Paycheck: The Life & Times of Katrina Gilbert
Transparent
Virunga

9th Annual (2016)
Born This Way
Going Clear: Scientology and the Prison of Belief
Homeland
The Knick
Mississippi Inferno
Winter on Fire: Ukraine's Fight for Freedom

10th Annual (2017)
Before the Flood
The Night Of
Speechless
This Is Us
We Will Rise: Michelle Obama's Mission to Educate Girls Around the World
Last Week Tonight with John Oliver

11th Annual (2018)
13 Reasons Why
Andi Mack
Daughters of Destiny
Forbidden: Undocumented and Queer in Rural America
Full Frontal with Samantha Bee
LA 92
One Day at a Time

12th Annual (2019)
Alexa & Katie
A Million Little Things
I Am Evidence
My Last Days
Pose
Rest in Power: The Trayvon Martin Story
RBG

13th Annual (2020)
16 Shots
At the Heart of Gold: Inside the USA Gymnastics Scandal
Patriot Act with Hasan Minhaj
Queen Sugar
Unbelievable
Watchmen

14th Annual (2021)
For Life
I Am Greta
I May Destroy You
Little America
The Daily Show
The Social Dilemma
Welcome to Chechnya

15th Annual (2022)
Black and Missing
Dopesick
Insecure
It's a Sin
Reservation Dogs
Taste the Nation: Holiday Edition
The Year Earth Changed

Hall of Fame

The Television Academy Hall of Fame was founded by a former president of the ATAS, John H. Mitchell (1921–1988), to honor individuals who have made extraordinary contributions to U.S. television. Inductions are not held every year.

See also

List of American television awards
National Academy of Television Arts and Sciences
International Academy of Television Arts and Sciences
Primetime Emmy Award

References

External links
Television Academy
Television Academy Foundation
Television shows and discussions by ATAS interviewees

 
+
Television organizations in the United States
1946 establishments in the United States
Organizations based in Los Angeles
North Hollywood, Los Angeles
Organizations established in 1946
501(c)(6) nonprofit organizations